David Guez won in the final against Benoît Paire 6–3, 6–1.

Seeds

Draw

Finals

Top half

Bottom half

References
Main Draw
Qualifying Singles

Arad Challenger - Singles
2010 Singles